The General Motors L platform (commonly called the L-body or L car) was a front-wheel drive compact car automotive platform that was produced from 1987 through 1996.

The L platform was very similar to the GM N platform however the 1st generation N cars were engineered by Oldsmobile while the L cars were engineered by Chevrolet. The L platform used a Twist-beam rear suspension and MacPherson struts in front and featured a  wheelbase.

Both platforms were used to replace the GM X platform on which the Citation, among others, were based.

Canadian Pontiac Tempest
Pontiac sold their own version of the L-Body in Canada only. It was marketed as the Tempest from 1987 to 1991. This model featured a unique grill and tail lamps (which were later used on the updated Corsica). This model was dropped following the 1991 model with due to the introduction of the new 1992 Grand Am sedan. Previously the Grand Am sedan had not been offered for sale in the Canadian market. 

The L car lasted just one generation, with the nameplates being retired and replaced by the GM N platform Chevrolet Malibu.

This platform was the basis for the following vehicles:
 1987–1996 Chevrolet Beretta
 1987–1996 Chevrolet Corsica
 1987–1991 Pontiac Tempest (Canada)

L